Asociación Deportiva Ceuta B is a Spanish football team based in the autonomous city of Ceuta. Founded in 2012, they are the reserve team of AD Ceuta FC, play in Tercera Federación – Group 10, and hold home matches at Estadio Alfonso Murube, with a capacity of 6,500.

History
Founded in 2012 along as Club Atlético de Ceuta, Ceuta B was a replacement to dissolved AD Ceuta B, and was renamed to AD Ceuta FC B in 2013 after the first team's renaming. In June 2021, the club achieved a first-ever promotion to Tercera División RFEF, after leading their group in the Regional Preferente.

Season to season

2 seasons in Tercera Federación

References

B
Spanish reserve football teams
Football clubs in Ceuta
Association football clubs established in 2012
2012 establishments in Spain